Bernt Eveart Persson (24 June 1946 to 20 September 2020) was a Swedish international motorcycle speedway rider.

Career
He finished runner up in the 1972 Speedway World Championship final. He rode in Britain for the Edinburgh Monarchs, the Cradley Heath Heathens (for eight seasons)  and one season with the Sheffield Tigers. He became Swedish Champion in 1977.

World Final Appearances

Individual World Championship
 1967 -  London, Wembley Stadium - 9th - 6pts
 1968 -  London, Wembley Stadium - 16th - 1pt
 1971 -  Göteborg, Ullevi - 6th - 9pts
 1972 -  London, Wembley Stadium - 2nd - 13pts
 1973 -  Chorzów, Silesian Stadium - 16th - 0pts
 1975 -  London, Wembley Stadium - 10th - 5pts
 1977 -  Göteborg, Ullevi - 11th - 6pts
 1978 -  London, Wembley Stadium - Reserve - did not ride

World Pairs Championship
 1971 -  Rybnik, Rybnik Municipal Stadium (with Anders Michanek) - 3rd - 22pts (9)
 1972 -  Borås (with Hasse Holmqvist) - 3rd - 22pts (13+3)
 1976 -  Eskilstuna, Eskilstuna Motorstadion (with Bengt Jansson) - 3rd - 22pts (11)
 1977 -  Manchester, Hyde Road (with Anders Michanek) - 2nd - 18pts (2)

World Team Cup
 1971 -  Wrocław, Olympic Stadium (with Anders Michanek / Sören Sjösten / Bengt Jansson / Leif Enecrona) - 4th - 18pts (0)
 1973 -  London, Wembley Stadium (with Anders Michanek / Bengt Jansson / Tommy Jansson) - 2nd - 31pts (9)
 1975 -  Norden, Motodrom Halbemond (with Anders Michanek / Tommy Jansson / Sören Sjösten / Sören Karlsson) - 3rd - 17pts (2)
 1976 -  London, White City Stadium (with Anders Michanek / Bengt Jansson / Lars-Åke Andersson  / Christer Löfqvist) - 3rd - 26pts (8)
 1977 -  Wrocław, Olympic Stadium (with Bengt Jansson / Anders Michanek / Tommy Nilsson / Sören Karlsson) - 4th - 11pts (4)

References

1946 births
2020 deaths
People from Eskilstuna
Swedish speedway riders
Cradley Heathens riders
Edinburgh Monarchs riders
Sheffield Tigers riders
Sportspeople from Södermanland County